Diána Reményi (born April 4, 1986 in Budapest) is a Hungarian former swimmer, who specialized in breaststroke and individual medley events. She is a two-time junior European champion, and a finalist at the European Short Course Swimming Championships. She is also a member of Budapesti Spartacus SC, and is coached and trained by György Turi.

Reményi made her international debut at the 2002 European Junior Swimming Championships in Linz, Austria. She won a total of four medals, including two golds each in the 200 m individual medley (2:16.35) and 400 m individual medley (4:46.20). She also helped out the Hungarians (Nikolett Szepesi, Katalin Taray, and Renata Papp) to take a bronze medal in the women's 4×100 m medley relay (4:16.44).

Reményi qualified for the women's 200 m breaststroke, along with defending Olympic champion Ágnes Kovács, at the 2004 Summer Olympics in Athens. She posted a FINA A-standard entry time of 2:28.12 from the World Championships in Barcelona, Spain. She was about to participate in heat three of the preliminary heats, but scratched out of the race for health and personal reasons.

References

External links
Profile – Modelvillag 

1986 births
Living people
Olympic swimmers of Hungary
Swimmers at the 2004 Summer Olympics
Hungarian female breaststroke swimmers
Hungarian female medley swimmers
Swimmers from Budapest